Sandra Elaine Allen (June 18, 1955 – August 13, 2008) was an American woman recognized by the Guinness World Records as the tallest woman in the world.

Allen wrote a book, Cast a Giant Shadow. Although over the years other women have taken the title of the tallest woman, Allen held it for the last sixteen years of her life. Her height was due to a tumor in her pituitary gland that caused it to release growth hormone uncontrollably, between 200 and 1,000 times more than usual. She grew up in Shelbyville, Indiana, and was raised by her grandmother, who worked as a cleaning woman. At the age of 22, in 1977, she underwent surgery for the condition. Lacking this procedure, Allen would have continued to grow and suffer further medical problems associated with gigantism.

She appeared in Fellini's Casanova, in the TV movie Side Show, and in a Canadian/American documentary film, Being Different. The New Zealand band Split Enz wrote a song about her, "Hello Sandy Allen", released on their 1982 album Time and Tide. Allen never married, saying that she was "an oldfashioned [sic] girl" and would not date a man shorter than her.

In later years, Allen used a wheelchair because her legs and back could no longer support her tall stature while standing. At one point, she was bedridden due to disease, causing atrophy of the muscles. Due to this limitation, she spent her last years in Shelbyville, Indiana, in the same retirement center as Edna Parker, the oldest living human at the time.

Allen died on August 13, 2008. Her family friend, Rita Rose, revealed that she suffered from a recurring blood infection, along with Type 2 diabetes, breathing troubles, and kidney failure.

A scholarship was dedicated in Allen's name at Shelbyville High School. In 2020, Allen's friend and manager, John Kleiman, donated a collection of her memorabilia to Ripley's Museums.

References

External links 
The World's Tallest Woman: The Giantess of Shelbyville High , hawthornepub.com
Biography, buzzfeed.com

Profile, educationworld.com
Life story, msnbc.msn.com
New York Times profile, nytimes.com
Obituary in the Evansville Courier & Press

1955 births
2008 deaths
20th-century American memoirists
American television actresses
People from Shelbyville, Indiana
People with gigantism
Deaths from sepsis
Deaths from kidney failure
American film actresses
American women memoirists
20th-century American actresses
21st-century American women